Karl Ludwig Friedrich Wilhelm Gustav von Alvensleben (1800–1868) was a German writer.

Life 
Ludwig von Alvensleben was born on 3 May 1800 in Berlin. He came from the Low German noble family of Alvensleben. At the age of thirteen, he took part in the German War of Liberation and began his career as an officer. In 1821, he was punished with two years of fortress arrest for a threatening letter written to Prince Augustus of Prussia. From 1825 to 1828, he completed a law degree in Leipzig, but could not take the final exam due to a lack of knowledge of Latin. However, he was able to make a living as a freelance writer, translator and journalist. In 1830, he was imprisoned for a short time because of a text "shadow and no light" (Schatten und kein Licht) printed in Halle and directed against the Leipzig police. In 1836, he temporarily directed the Meiningen Court Theatre. In 1841, he moved to Vienna. There he took an active part in the revolutionary uprisings in October 1848 and was initially sentenced to death after being arrested, but then pardoned to one year in prison and expelled from Vienna after serving his sentence. His literary work was often impaired by frequent illnesses, so that he was in need and had to be supported by his family.

Works 
Alvensleben was a versatile writer in the fields of entertainment, games and the theatre. Under his pseudonyms Gustav Sellen and Chlodwig he wrote a number of his own novellas and novels, was successful as a translator from English and French and was the editor of various magazines. The journal Allgemeine Theater-Chronik, founded by him in 1832, is still significant in terms of theatre history. It appeared until 1873 and  he edited it until 1837. He also published the Journal for the German Aristocracy with Friedrich de la Motte Fouqué from 1840 to 1844.

His translations included  [[Napoléon Bonaparte|Napoleons Werke]] (6 volumes, Chemnitz 1840), Eugène Sue's Sämmtliche Werke (Leipzig 1838–46) in 24 volumes and the works of Balzac, Molière, Dumas, Swift (Gulliver's Travels), Defoe (Robinson Crusoe), Casanova (Memoirs in 13 books). In total, he translated over 140 novels and plays and alongside Georg Nikolaus Bärmann (1785-1850), was the most important German translator of his time.

Among his own works is The Lying Emperor - Destinies of the Lord of  Münchhausen jun. (Meissen and Pesth 1833) - a time-critical satire that was reprinted in 1966 and 1968 (as a paperback) - together with the original Münchhausen from 1768 - and characterized as follows: "Alvensleben was a revolutionary spirit who had the courage to show the breaks he recognized in the state and social order as well as in the way people live and work together. This remarkable attitude, which did not stop at his own, still privileged social class, makes him particularly likeable. " (Wackermann, 1966).

His other works included: Erzählungen, Der strafende Burggeist (historical novel),  Novellas and Narratives  (Nuremberg 1831),  The Debunked Jesuit  '(Meißen 1831 - several editions),' 'Life and travel pictures and novellas (Leipzig 1841),  Encyclopedia of board games' '(Leipzig 1853, nine editions until 1893),' 'Polterabend-Scherze' '(Quedlinburg 1858, nine editions until 1888),   Garibaldi  (biography, Weimar 1859),  Prince Lobkowitz or: Revenge to the grave . (Historical novel, 3 volumes, Vienna 1862/63),  General world history for the people  (3 volumes, Vienna 1865-1872).

 Family 
He was a son of the Prussian hussar major, August von Alvensleben (1775–1819), from the House of Redekin, and Countess Charlotte von Schlippenbach a.d.H. Schönermark (1777-1831). In 1828, he married Florentine Herzog (1807-1833); in 1834, Elvire Böhn (1818-1853) and in his third marriage in 1853, Emma Greiffeld (1831-1909). These marriages resulted in nine children, five of whom died in childhood. His grandmother was the actress, Friederike von Alvensleben, born née von Klinglin (1749-1799). This line expired with Bodo von Alvensleben (1903-1954) in the male line. Ludwig von Alvensleben died on 3 August 1868 in Vienna. 

 References 

 Literature 
 
 
 
 

Further reading
 Meyers Konversationslexikon, 1841, S. 424
 Constantin von Wurzbach: Alvensleben, Louis von. In: Biographisches Lexikon des Kaiserthums Oesterreich. 22. Theil. Kaiserlich-königliche Hof- und Staatsdruckerei, Wien 1870, S. 462 (Digitalisat).
 
 Wilhelm Kosch: Deutsches Literatur-Lexikon. Bern und München 1968, S. 89 f.
 Erwin Wackermann, ed. (1966): Münchhausens wunderbare Reisen. 2nd expanded edn. Hamburg.
 Walter Killy (ed.): Literaturlexikon'', Band 1. Bertelsmann Lexikon Verlag (1988), S. 118.

External links 

 The Alvensleben family (in German)
 
 

Ludwig
German male writers
German-language writers
Translators from English
Translators from French
Translators to German
1800 births
1868 deaths
Card game book writers